Argentina has submitted films for the Academy Award for Best International Feature Film since 1961. The award is handed out annually by the United States Academy of Motion Picture Arts and Sciences to a feature-length motion picture produced outside the United States that contains primarily non-English dialogue. The award was not created until the 1956 Academy Awards, in which a competitive Academy Award of Merit, known as the Best Foreign Language Film Award, was created for non-English speaking films, and has been given annually since.

Previously, in 1948, Argentina participated with Luis César Amadori's Dios se lo pague for an Honorary Award to the best foreign-language film released in the United States, making it the first Argentine film to be presented in the Academy Awards. It lost to Monsieur Vincent. These awards were not competitive, as there were no nominees but simply a winner every year that was voted on by the Board of Governors of the Academy.

, eight Argentine films have been nominated by the Academy for the Academy Award for Best Foreign Language Film. Two of these, Luis Puenzo's The Official Story and Juan José Campanella's The Secret In Their Eyes, won the award.

Nine Argentine directors have had multiple films submitted to the Academy for review. Of these, Marcelo Piñeyro and Pablo Trapero have been selected a record three times, and only Juan José Campanella has managed multiple Oscar nominations. Since The Official Story took home the award at the 1986 Oscars, Argentina has never failed to submit a film to the competition.

Among all the countries that have received the Academy Award for Best Foreign Language Film, Argentina (with two awards) is one of four Spanish-speaking countries that have done so, the others being Chile (one award), Mexico (one award), and Spain (four awards).

The Argentina nominee is selected annually by the Academia de las Artes y Ciencias Cinematográficas de la Argentina. The selection committee holds separate votes to decide which film goes to the Oscars and, in a separate vote, which film goes to the Spanish Goya Awards.

Submissions
The Academy of Motion Picture Arts and Sciences has invited the film industries of various countries to submit their best film for the Academy Award for Best Foreign Language Film since 1956. The Foreign Language Film Award Committee oversees the process and reviews all the submitted films. Following this, they vote via secret ballot to determine the five nominees for the award. Below is a list of the films that have been submitted by Argentina for review by the Academy for the award by year and the respective Academy Awards ceremony. All films are in Spanish.

See also
 List of Argentine Academy Award winners and nominees
 List of Academy Award winners and nominees for Best Foreign Language Film
 List of Academy Award-winning foreign language films
 Cinema of Argentina

Notes

References

External links
 The Official Academy Awards Database
 The Motion Picture Credits Database
 IMDb Academy Awards Page

Argentina
Academy Award